The 2022 V8 SuperUtes Series (known for sponsorship reasons as 2022 Haltech V8 SuperUtes Series) will be the fourth running season of the motorsport series.

Calendar

Teams and drivers

References

SuperUtes